This is a list of the main career statistics of German professional tennis player Alexander Zverev. All statistics are according to the ATP Tour and ITF website.

Performance timelines

Singles
Current through the 2023 Indian Wells Masters.

Doubles 
Current through the 2023 Indian Wells Masters.

Significant finals

Grand Slam finals

Singles: 1 (1 runner-up)

Olympic medal matches

Singles: 1 (1 Gold medal)

Year-end championships

Singles: 2 (2 titles)

Masters tournaments
Zverev is the youngest player to win two consecutive Masters 1000 titles on different surfaces since the format started in 1990. Zverev is also the first player born in the 1990s to win multiple Masters 1000 titles.

Singles: 10 (5 titles, 5 runner-ups)

ATP career finals

Singles: 30 (19 titles, 11 runner-ups)

Doubles: 7 (2 titles, 5 runner-ups)

ATP Challengers and ITF Futures finals

Singles: 3 (2 titles, 1 runner-up)

Junior Grand Slam finals

Singles: 2 (1 title, 1 runner-up)

Head-to-head records

Record against top-10 players
Zverev's match record against players who have been ranked in the top 10, with those who are active in boldface.
Only ATP Tour (incl. Grand Slams) main draw, Davis Cup and Laver Cup matches are considered.

Record against No. 11–20 players 
Zverev's record against players who have been ranked world No. 11–20, with those who are active in boldface.

 Alex de Minaur 6–1
 Frances Tiafoe 6–1
 Kyle Edmund 4–0
 Sam Querrey 3–0
 Nikoloz Basilashvili 3–1
 Viktor Troicki 3–1
 Borna Ćorić 3–3
 Nick Kyrgios 3–4
 Guido Pella 2–0
 Philipp Kohlschreiber 2–3
 Marco Cecchinato 1–0
 Alexandr Dolgopolov 1–0
 Feliciano López 1–0
 Lorenzo Musetti 1–0
 Jarkko Nieminen 1–0
 Benoît Paire 1–0
 Albert Ramos Viñolas 1–0
 Cristian Garín 1–1
 Marcel Granollers 1–1
 Paul-Henri Mathieu 1–1
 Andreas Seppi 1–1
 Chung Hyeon 1–2
 Pablo Cuevas 0–1
 Ivo Karlović 0–1
 Florian Mayer 0–1
 Tommy Paul 0–2

* Statistics correct .

Wins over top-10 players
Zverev has a  record against players who were, at the time the match was played, ranked in the top 10.

National and international participation

Team competitions finals: 7 (5 titles, 2 runner-ups)

Olympic Games (8–1)

Laver Cup (8–3)

Davis Cup (9–6)

United Cup (1–2)

ATP Cup (4–7)

Hopman Cup finals (0–4)

Grand Slam seedings

*

ATP Tour career earnings

* Statistics correct .

German tournaments

References

Zverev Jr., Alexander